The Folklore Museum of Drama located in Drama in northern Greece was launched by the Lyceum Club of Greek Women in recent years. It is a project to classify and display its considerable collection of costumes and artifacts of the folk culture of Drama and the wider area. It has devoted a large part of its new, privately owned premises (three floors) to an exhibition of the collection.

Exhibits
The museum has reached the final stages of arranging the exhibits in the showcases and is expected to open its doors to the public in mid-2000. The exhibits include, among many other things, a number of authentic folk costumes from Drama, the surrounding area, and the rest of Greece, old furniture from urban and rural homes, a barrel-organ, and a multitude of old objects.

Gallery

References

Citations

Sources
 

Folk museums in Eastern Macedonia and Thrace
2000 establishments in Greece
Buildings and structures in Drama, Greece
Museums established in 2000